Amygdalodon ("almond tooth" for its almond shaped teeth) was a genus of basal sauropod from the Middle Jurassic of Argentina. The type species is Amygdalodon patagonicus. Fossils of Amygdalodon have been found in the Toarcian Cerro Carnerero Formation of the Jurassic (about 180-172 million years ago).  Very little is known about it, but it is one of the few Jurassic dinosaurs from South America found thus far.

Discovery
The holotype (MLP 46-VIII-21-1) consists of some vertebrae, ribs, four complete and three partial teeth, and a partial pelvis and shoulder-blade, of which was discovered in 1936. The type species, Amygdalodon patagonicus, was described by Cabrera in Argentina in 1947. Until 1936 sauropod fossils from Argentina were completely unknown then, prompted by Piatnitzky's brief mention of "bones of a saurian of no less than 5-7m long", Dr. Tomás Suero took a trip to Chubut to check out deposits overlying the Liassic of the Pampa de Agnia and discovered the remains of a Jurassic sauropod dinosaur around twice the size of Piatnitzky's estimation (in 1936).

Size

Classification 
Rauhut (2003) placed Amygdalodon as Eusauropoda incertae sedis based on examination of the type material. Later, a cladistic analysis conducted by Carballido et al. (2010) recovered the genus as a non-eusauropod sauropod. Holwerda and Pol (2018) concurred, recovering Amygdalodon as sister to Isanosaurus. A basal sauropod classification for Amygdalodon was supported by Pol and colleagues in 2022, with it showing the first signs of dental modification for bulk feeding that is retained later sauropods, but it does not have the vertebral features found in more derived sauropods. They found it in a polytomy with the Asian taxon Gongxianosaurus, and possibly related to South American Volkheimeria, though the latter had a very labile position.

References

External links 
 DinoDictionary

Sauropods
Dinosaur genera
Toarcian life
Middle Jurassic dinosaurs of South America
Jurassic Argentina
Fossils of Argentina
Golfo San Jorge Basin
Fossil taxa described in 1947
Taxa named by Ángel Cabrera